This is the complete discography of Swiss black metal band Zeal & Ardor. They have released three albums, two live albums, one EP, six B-sides and 15 singles.

Albums

Studio albums

Live albums
Live In Montreux (2018)
Live in London (2019)

Demo albums
Zeal and Ardor (2014)

EPs

Singles
"Devil Is Fine" (2016)
"Come On Down" (2017)
"Gravedigger's Chant (2018)
"Waste" (2018)
"Built On Ashes" (2018)
"You Ain't Coming Back" (2018)
"I Can't Breathe" (2020)
"Vigil" (2020)
"Tuskegee" (2020)
"Trust No One" (2020)
"Wake of a Nation" (2020)
"Run" (2021)
"Erase" (2021)
"Bow" (2021)
"Götterdämmerung" (2021)
"Golden Liar" (2021)
"Church Burns" (2022)
"Firewake" (2022)

Other appearances
"Baphomet" (2017) - 2017 Adult Swim Singles Program
"Last Coat of Paint" - The Needle Drop LP (2019)
"We Can't Be Found (Live 2018)" - Live At Wacken 2018: 29 Years Louder Than Hell (2019)
"Footsteps at the Pond (Zeal & Ardor remix)" - on Panorama Remixed by La Dispute (2019)remix
"Run (GEIZ version)" (2021)
"Calloway" - Apple Music's Juneteenth 2021 Freedom Songs (2021) Juneteenth

References

Discographies of Swiss artists